The Linograph Company Building, also known as the Englehart Manufacturing Company Building and RiverWalk Lofts , is a historic building located in downtown Davenport, Iowa, United States. It was listed on the Davenport Register of Historic Properties and on the National Register of Historic Places in 2009.

History
The Linograph Company Building was designed by two prominent Davenport architects. The original building was the work of the architectural firm of Clausen & Kruse. The 1949 addition was the work of Arthur Ebeling.

The building was an industrial facility for the company, which made the Linograph typesetting machine. The machines were distributed internationally, as well as across the country, and they "contributed significantly to the advancement of the typesetting process."  The company occupied the building until 1944 when it was sold to a competitor, Intertype Corporation and Englehart Manufacturing Co. In 1954 The Salvation Army acquired the building, and used it for a variety of purposes, including an Adult Rehabilitation Center, which relocated in 2004. MetroPlains Development of St. Paul, Minnesota bought the building in July 2007, and started converting the building into loft apartments in October of the same year. The $8 million project was completed in 2009.

Architecture
The building is a four-story, rectangular structure built of concrete on a raised concrete foundation. Extensions were added to the east of the original structure, which altered the building's main entrance. Some of the windows were filled in over the years, but large windows were placed in the building's fenestration during the 2009 renovation. A loading dock on the south side of the building was covered over at some point.

References

Industrial buildings completed in 1920
Apartment buildings in Davenport, Iowa
Davenport Register of Historic Properties
Industrial buildings and structures on the National Register of Historic Places in Iowa
National Register of Historic Places in Davenport, Iowa